Ammospiza is a genus of birds in the family Passerellidae, in the group known as American sparrows.

Species

 Seaside sparrow, Ammospiza maritima
 Dusky seaside sparrow, Ammospiza maritima nigrescens (extinct, 1987)
 Cape Sable seaside sparrow, Ammospiza maritima mirabilis
 Scott's seaside sparrow, Ammospiza maritima peninsulae
 Nelson's sparrow, Ammospiza nelsoni
 Saltmarsh sparrow, Ammospiza caudacuta
 LeConte's sparrow, Ammospiza leconteii

References

 

 
Bird genera
American sparrows
Taxa named by Harry C. Oberholser